Wayne Arthur Fuller (born June 15, 1931) is an American statistician who has specialised in econometrics, survey sampling and time series analysis. He was on the staff of Iowa State University from 1959, becoming a Distinguished Professor in 1983.

Fuller received his degrees from Iowa State University, with a B.S. in 1955, an M.S. in 1957 and a Ph.D. in Agricultural Economics in 1959. During his long career at Iowa State, he supervised 88 Ph.D. or M.S. dissertations.

Fuller is a fellow of the American Statistical Association, the Econometric Society, the Institute of Mathematical Statistics, and the International Statistical Institute. Fuller also served as an editor of the American Journal of Agricultural Economics, Journal of the American Statistical Association, The American Statistician, Journal of Business and Economic Statistics, and Survey Methodology. He also served on numerous National Academy of Science panels and was a member of the Committee on National Statistics. Wayne Fuller received 2003 Marvin Zelen Leadership Award in Statistical Science. He also received the 2002 Waksberg Award from the journal Survey Methodology.

In 2009, he received an honorary doctorate from North Carolina State University. In 2011, he received an honorary doctorate from the University of Neuchâtel (Switzerland).

Important works
 
 Fuller, W.A. (1987) Measurement Error Models, Wiley. 
 Fuller, W.A. (1996) Introduction to Statistical Time Series, 2nd Edition, Wiley. 
 Fuller, W.A. (2009) Sampling Statistics, Wiley.

References

External links

ISI Highly cited researchers
Wayne Fuller's home-page at Iowa State University

1931 births
Living people
Iowa State University alumni
Iowa State University faculty
American statisticians
Survey methodologists
Time series econometricians
Fellows of the American Statistical Association
Fellows of the Institute of Mathematical Statistics
Fellows of the Econometric Society